Maksim Mikhailovich Plopa (born 23 January 1990) is a Moldovan-Russian football player who plays as a centre-back for FC Murom.

Career
Plopa was a registered Khimki player in the 2008 Russian Premier League season, but only played for the reserves. He made his professional debut for Saturn on 15 July 2009 in the Russian Cup game against FC Luch-Energiya Vladivostok.

He made his Russian Football National League debut for FC Baltika Kaliningrad on 27 June 2011 in a game against FC Nizhny Novgorod.

External links
 
 

1990 births
People from Bălți
Living people
Moldovan footballers
Russian footballers
FC Saturn Ramenskoye players
FC Baltika Kaliningrad players
FC Sibir Novosibirsk players
FC Orenburg players
Association football defenders
FC Khimki players